The Stretford Wives is a British drama film made by the BBC. It was first broadcast on BBC One in August 2002. It was written by Shameless writer Danny Brocklehurst and directed by Peter Webber.

Plot
The film revolves around the lives of three sisters – played by Fay Ripley, Claire Rushbrook, and Lindsey Coulson – who live in Stretford, Greater Manchester, England.

Cast
 Fay Ripley as Donna Massey Brent
 Claire Rushbrook as Elaine Massey Simmons
 Lindsey Coulson as Lynda Massey Richards
 Rita Tushingham as Marilyn Massey
 Mark Frost as Billy Brent
 Joe Dixon as Dave McCarthy
 Adrian Rawlins as Frank Foster

Reception

Critical reception
It won critical acclaim from The Times and The Independent, although reviews in some local papers were not so favourable.

Viewership
The programme was watched by 5.7 million viewers.

Home media
It has not been released on DVD.

References

External links
 

2002 television films
2002 films
2002 drama films
Films directed by Peter Webber
2000s British films
British drama television films